Karmasan (Qarmasan) is a rural locality (a selo) and the administrative centre of Karmasansky Selsoviet, Ufimsky District, Bashkortostan, Russia. The population was 706 as of 2010.

Geography 
Karmasan is located 51 km northwest of Ufa (the district's administrative centre) by road. Asanovo is the nearest rural locality.

References 

Rural localities in Ufimsky District